Results from the 2009 Buenos Aires Grand Prix held at Buenos Aires on September 13, 2009, in the Autódromo Oscar Alfredo Gálvez. The race was the second race for the 2009 Buenos Aires Grand Prix of 2009 Formula Three Sudamericana season.

Classification

Buenos Aires Grand Prix
2009 in Argentine motorsport
Buenos Aires Grand Prix Race 2
September 2009 sports events in South America